Augustus Walford (A.W.) Weedon was born in 1838 in London. He was a landscape painter in watercolour, and was the auditor of the Royal Society of British Artists in 1887 when James McNeill Whistler was President.

His many scenes included works from Sussex, Hampshire and Scotland and one artwork is present in the panels of the lounge at the Inn in Fittleworth.
He died in 1908.

References

Wood, Christopher, The Dictionary of Victorian Artists 2nd ed., revised, Woodbridge, 1978.

1838 births
1908 deaths
19th-century English painters
English male painters
20th-century English painters
English landscape painters
19th-century English male artists
20th-century English male artists